Shiloh High School is a public high school located in Snellville, Georgia, United States, in southern Gwinnett County.  The school is part of the Gwinnett County Public Schools system and opened in 1984.  It serves students in the Shiloh Cluster, which feeds from the Anderson Livsey, Annistown, Centerville, Partee, and Shiloh Elementary Schools and Shiloh Middle School.

The school mascot is the General, and the school colors are black, silver, and white.

Shiloh, like Peachtree Ridge, was on block scheduling, and until the 2015-2016 school year, was on a regular six-period day starting 2008-2009, but is now again on a block schedule.

The school mascot and colors were selected through a student contest before it officially opened in 1984. Eve Embry (Class of 1986) designed the emblem, which appears on the old gym floor.

International Baccalaureate Program
As of 2014, Shiloh High School has been approved for International Baccalaureate, which is the second school in Gwinnett County to do so, the first being Norcross High School. Shiloh was also approved for the Career-Related Certificate, which is a fork of the original IB program.

Athletics
Varsity sports at the school include the following.

Baseball
The Shiloh Generals baseball team were the state champions of 1987. For 1986-2009, the team had an overall record of 330-274. They have made state and regional playoffs several years in a row.

Basketball
SWAT Team
Cross country
Football 
Golf
Soccer
Softball
Tennis
Volleyball
Wrestling

SWAT Team
Shiloh's Competitive Cheerleading team won 5-A State Championship in 2002 with a stunning record of 50-1, and earned the State Runner-Up title in 2003.

Soccer
The men's 8-AAAAA won state championship in the 2003 season.

The men's varsity soccer team won state championship in the 1990 season.

Track & field
The boys' team captured its first title in this sport in 2014.  The team was led by Coach Rob Blaszkiewcz (his first year at Shiloh). Junior Jeremy McDuffie and senior Grant Swinton delivered a dominating performance, capturing the triple jump, 300 hurdles, 110 hurdles and 4x100 state crowns (that included Aymir Taylor, Noel Rhymer, Jermy Mcduffie, and Grant Swinton). Grant Swinton was runner up in the 200m and 400m dash. Both the boys and girls have set numerous county and state records.2013 Grant Swinton won the state championship in the 400m dash. Lauren Johnson made the GHSA Girls' State Championship in 2003 with a 37-0 in the triple jump. Terrence Anderson did 21.91p in the 200 meter dash at the 2007 Gwinnett County Championships. The 2003 ladies' sprint team qualified to compete in both Region and GHSA State Championship in the 4X100 and 4X100 relays. The 2008 boys' team (sprinters Rueben Lacy, Brandon Richardson, Nehemyah Price, and Eugene Glenn) won the 4X100 relays in the Region and qualified for the GHSA State Championship finals after running a time of 42.20 in the State Prelims. Alumna Natalie Knight later went on to compete for the U.S. Olympic Trials.

Swim & dive
The Shiloh swim & dive team made the Georgia State Top 10 Teams in 1991, 1992, 1993, 1994, 1995, 2000, 2001, 2002, 2003, and 2004. They made All-State Honors in 1987, 1988, 1989, 1990, 1991, 1992, 1993, 1994, 1995, 1999, 2000, 2001, 2002, 2003, 2004, and 2007. Shiloh was the state champion in 1992 and 1994.

Notable alumni
 Diana DeGarmo - 2004 American Idol finalist
 Rusty Joiner - actor and model
 Lance Krall - improv comedian and actor
 Kyle Lewis - MLB baseball player
 Josh Okogie - NBA basketball player
 David Pollack - former NFL football player
 Cameron Sample - NFL football player
 Troy Sanders - bassist and vocalist for heavy metal band Mastodon
 John Clarence Stewart - actor and singer
 Stephen Weatherly - NFL football player

References

External links
Shiloh High School
Gwinnett County Public Schools

Public high schools in Georgia (U.S. state)
Schools in Gwinnett County, Georgia
1984 establishments in Georgia (U.S. state)
Educational institutions established in 1984